Steven Daniel Shell (born March 10, 1983) is a former Major League Baseball pitcher. He made his major league debut on June 22, 2008.

Playing career
Played high school ball in Minco and El Reno Oklahoma. His senior year he was named Oklahoma Gatorade Player of the Year. Shell was drafted straight out of high school in the 3rd round of the  amateur draft by the Anaheim Angels. Shell pitched in the Angels organization from 2001–. In the off season of the 2007 season, Shell pitched for team USA and was the winning pitcher in the gold medal game verses Cuba. He became a minor league free agent after the 2007 season and signed a minor league contract with the Washington Nationals. On July 11, 2008, he set the Nationals' record for the longest save in club history. He pitched 3 scoreless innings against the Astros to get the record as well as his first career save. On April 29, 2009 Shell refused a minor league assignment and became a free agent. On May 2, 2009 Shell signed a minor league deal with the Seattle Mariners.

On November 15, 2010, Shell signed a minor league contract with the Kansas City Royals. On May 8, 2011, Shell was released. On May 19, 2011, he signed a minor league contract with the Atlanta Braves and was assigned to Triple-A Gwinnett the following day. A free agent again after the 2011 season.

After leaving baseball in 2011, Shell is currently working as an Operations Tech for Husky Ventures.

Personal life
Shell was married to model, internet blogger and fitness entrepreneur Kenna Shell 2006-2015.  The couple have one child, Tyler Shell, born May 18, 2009. He now owns an oil business as well as a store in a cookie franchise in Yukon, Oklahoma.

References

External links

1983 births
Living people
Arizona League Angels players
Arkansas Travelers players
Baseball players from Texas
Cardenales de Lara players
American expatriate baseball players in Venezuela
Cedar Rapids Kernels players
Columbus Clippers players
Gwinnett Braves players
Omaha Storm Chasers players
Major League Baseball pitchers
People from Longview, Texas
Provo Angels players
Rancho Cucamonga Quakes players
Salt Lake Bees players
Tacoma Rainiers players
Washington Nationals players
West Tennessee Diamond Jaxx players